The lieutenant governor of Colorado is the second-highest-ranking member of the executive department of the Government of Colorado, United States, below the governor of Colorado. The lieutenant governor of Colorado, who acts as governor of Colorado in the absence of the officeholder and succeeds to the governorship in case of vacancy, is elected on a partisan ticket.

After the 1966 general election, the Constitution of Colorado was amended to require the joint election of governor and lieutenant governor — candidates running as a ticket. Prior to this amendment, the lieutenant governor candidate was elected separately from the governor during the same election—sometimes resulting in a governor and a lieutenant governor from different political parties.

The current lieutenant governor is Dianne Primavera, a Democrat, who took office 8 January 2019.

Lieutenant governors

Notes

References
General

 Mike Mauer, Molly Otto, Gay Roesch, "Presidents and Speakers of the Colorado General Assembly." Denver: Colorado Legislative Council, 2013. 

Constitutions

Specific

See also

Outline of Colorado
Index of Colorado-related articles
State of Colorado
Law and government of Colorado
Governor of Colorado

Colorado General Assembly
Colorado Senate
Colorado House of Representatives
Courts of Colorado
Colorado Supreme Court
United States of America
United States Congress
United States congressional delegations from Colorado
List of United States senators from Colorado
Colorado's congressional districts
List of United States representatives from Colorado

External links
State of Colorado website
Office of the Lieutenant Governor of the State of Colorado
Biographies of the Lieutenant Governors of the State of Colorado from the Colorado State Archives

Lieutenant Governors

Colorado